Diablo Dam is one of three dams along the upper Skagit River in Whatcom County, Washington and part of the Skagit River Hydroelectric Project that supplies Seattle with some of its power needs. Construction began in 1927, and was completed in 1930. The dam began generating electricity in 1936.

The result was a power-generating dam that holds a reservoir known as Diablo Lake. Water from the dam operates two main generators, each with a capacity of 64.5 MW. The dam and its original associated power generation infrastructure were listed on the National Register of Historic Places in 1989.

Climate
The dam is in a transitional maritime-mediterranean climate (Köppen (Cfb/Csb) depending on summer rainfall isotherm.

Panorama

See also 

 List of dams and reservoirs in Washington
 Skagit River

References

External links
 Diablo Dam, 1929-1932 (Part 1) (Part 2) (Part 3) – silent film clips of construction posted by Seattle Municipal Archives on YouTube

External links
Historic American Engineering Record (HAER) documentation, filed under Newhalem, Whatcom County, WA:

Dams in Washington (state)
Seattle City Light dams
Buildings and structures in Whatcom County, Washington
Historic American Engineering Record in Washington (state)
Hydroelectric power plants in Washington (state)
United States power company dams
Dams completed in 1930
Energy infrastructure completed in 1936
Arch dams
Dams on the Skagit River
National Register of Historic Places in Ross Lake National Recreation Area